Willi Kafel (born 6 July 1930) is an Austrian gymnast. He competed in eight events at the 1960 Summer Olympics.

References

External links
 

1930 births
Possibly living people
Austrian male artistic gymnasts
Olympic gymnasts of Austria
Gymnasts at the 1960 Summer Olympics
20th-century Austrian people